Xestia tamsi is a species of moth of the family Noctuidae. It is found in Taiwan.

The wingspan is 35–45 mm.

References

Moths described in 1929
Xestia
Moths of Taiwan